In the education system of the Czech Republic, the Student Chamber of the Council of Higher Education Institutions (SK RVŠ), together with the Czech Rectors Conference (ČKR), forms the official representation of Czech Higher Education Institutes (HEIs), on the basis of the Higher Education Act of the Czech Republic, Article 92.

Student representation in the Czech Republic

Students of universities and colleges in the Czech Republic are represented:

 at the faculty and university level by academic senates (this applies primarily to public HEIs),
 at the national and international level by the SK RVŠ (this also applies to private HEIs).

Every HEI can join the council after paying fees for its delegates. Each HEI may send three delegates to the council, one of whom is a student. Besides that, for each faculty of an HEI, one more delegate may be deputised. An HEI's delegates are elected for a three-year term by its governing body, called the Academic Senate (this applies mainly to public HEIs).

Objective

The main purpose of the Chamber is to represent and defend the interests of students from all public, state, military, police, and private HEIs. The Chamber approves its own Programme Declaration for each three-year election term. During the 2006–2008 term, the Chamber lobbied for diversified, quality, open, and permeable higher education systems, and also to emphasize the social dimension of higher education. One of the Chamber's proposals is to prohibit age discrimination related to student status (i.e. various advantages linked to student status before reaching 26 years). Another key issue is the reform of tertiary education (tuition fees, management-line governance and expansion of study opportunities).

History

The SK RVŠ was established via an amendment to the Statute of the council on 5 November 1992. At that point, every HEI could send a student delegate to the Chamber, but these were not considered members of the council. This changed in 1996 when the members of the Chamber became full members of the council. The most recent changes came into force on 1 January 2006, including an increase to five delegates to the Presidium of the council.

Internal structures

The Council consists of the Assembly, Presidium and Closer Presidium and is headed by the Chair of the council. The Chamber's Chair, two Vice-chairs and two more delegates of the Chamber, who form the board of the SK RVŠ, are automatically members of the Presidium of the council. In the Closer Presidium, elected by the Assembly of the council, the Chamber is represented by its chair.

The SK RVŠ is generally involved in matters related to student life and study conditions. In respecting the Statute of the council, the SK RVŠ is allowed to deal under its own rules of organization, and it is authorized to create its own committees as advisory bodies. In the current Chamber, there are three committees: on legislation, on social and economical affairs, and on educational and scientific activities.

In the standing session (2021-2023) of the SK RVŠ the following commissions and working groups were established:

Commission for University Administration (KVS)
Commission for Doctoral Education (KDS)
Legislative Commission (LK)
Working group for foreign affairs (PRASK ZZ)
Expert groups (ES)

Working groups are established on a more informal basis in which the head is a coordinator.

Partners

The Chamber's partners in discussions concerning matters of HEIs students are: the council, the Czech Rectors Conference, the Parliament of the Czech Republic, the Government of the Czech Republic and its ministries, in particular the Ministry of Education, Youth and Sports, the Accreditation Commission, academic senates and organizations acting in the field of development of the academic and student community. On the international level, partners of the Chamber include several European Union institutions, Europe-wide student organizations (European Students' Union, EURODOC) and national Student Unions from the Visegrád countries (known as the V4+ Student Alliance), or any other country with experience relevant to the Czech Republic.

Jan Opletal Prize

Since 2004 the SK RVŠ has been awarding the Jan Opletal Prize, awarded to individuals or groups for their outstanding work in academia, the promotion of academic and student rights and freedoms, significant contributions in the fight against injustice, for equal rights or against any kind of discrimination. The prize is awarded every second year.

Nominees for the award may be suggested by the members of the SK RVŠ, members of Academic Senates and Faculties or Student Governing Bodies of private universities, the president or the dean of a Faculty, or at least five university students, legal entities which are connected to the support of higher education in the Czech Republic.

The recipient of the award decided by a committee, consisting of student and academic representatives of Czech Universities, delegates of the members of the SK RVŠ, two significant figures of higher education, two significant figures representing the civil society and the head of the committee, who is usually the previous laureate of the prize.

Jan Opletal Prize laureates include:
2004 - Zdeněk Hirnšal, Martin Laštovička a Jiří Slezák, Technical University in Brno
2005 - David Tonzar
2006 - Jaroslav Švec, Academic centre for student activities
2007 - Jaroslav Kuba, Technical University in Prague
2009 - Kateřina Volná, Charles University
2012 - Zdeněk Ručka, Masaryk University
2015 - Kateřina Mazánková, Lukáš Miklas and president Josef Salač, Police academy of the Czech Republic in Prague
2017 - Josef Fontana, Charles University
2019 - Michal Zima, Charles University
2021 - Michal Nguyen, Palacký University Olomouc

References

External links
Student Chamber (SK RVŠ)
Council of HEIs (RVŠ)
Czech Rectors Conference (ČKR)

Students' unions
Groups of students' unions